Topper is an archaeological site located along the Savannah River in Allendale County, South Carolina, United States. It is noted as a location of artifacts which some archaeologists believe to indicate human habitation of the New World earlier than the Clovis culture. The latter were previously believed to be the first people in North America.  

Artifacts at this site may predate Clovis by 3,000 years or more, but these conclusions are disputed.  The primary excavation has gone down to a level that dates to at least 50,000 B.C.E., searching for evidence of cultural artifacts.  Until increasing challenges in the first decade of the 21st century to the Clovis theory based on this site and others, it was unusual for archaeologists to dig deeper than the layer of the Clovis culture, as they then believed that no human artifacts would be found older than Clovis.  Among the objects from the "pre-Clovis" stratum, dated to 16,000-20,000 years BP, is a large piece of rock nicknamed the "Topper Chopper."

Geography
Topper lies along the eastern side of the Savannah River. The site is located on a large parcel of secure, private land owned by Archroma, a color and specialty chemicals company and is not open for public access.

Clovis culture
Since the 1930s, the prevailing theory concerning the peopling of the New World is that the first human inhabitants were the Clovis people, who are thought to have appeared approximately 13,500 years ago. Artifacts of the Clovis people are found throughout most of the United States and as far south as Panama in Central America. Since the early 21st century, this standard theory has been challenged based on the discovery and dating of pre-Clovis sites such as Monte Verde in Southern Chile, Cactus Hill in Virginia, and Buttermilk Creek in Texas.

Pre Clovis dispute

In 2004, Albert Goodyear of the University of South Carolina announced that carbonized plant remains, found as a dark stain in the light soil at the lowest excavated level at the Topper Site, had been radiocarbon dated to approximately 50,000 years ago, or approximately 37,000 years before the Clovis people. Goodyear, who began excavating the Topper site in the 1980s, believes that lithic objects at that level are rudimentary stone tools (and thus "artifacts").  Other archaeologists dispute this conclusion, suggesting that the objects are natural and not human-made.  Some archaeologists also have challenged the radiocarbon dating of the carbonized remains at Topper, arguing that 1) the stain represented the result of a natural fire, and 2) 50,000 years is the theoretical upper limit of effective radiocarbon dating, meaning that the stratum is radiocarbon dead, rather than dating to that time period.  Goodyear discovered the objects by digging 4 meters deeper than the Clovis artifacts readily found at the site. Before discovering the oldest lithics, he had discovered other objects which he claimed were tools dating around 16,000 years old, or about 3,000 years before Clovis.

According to Dean Snow, this assertion of 3,000 years is a much more likely and plausible number than the upper limit of radiocarbon dating. Evidence predating Clovis culture by a few thousand years is popularly termed as the "pioneer" stage of Clovis culture. This would be the birth of the culture and the start of the tool set. Researchers agree that the lack of evidence would stem from the lack of materials at hand. New techniques would take time to spread. The pioneer hypothesis allows for tools to predate by centuries rather than millennia.

Allendale expedition
The annual Allendale expedition (which ended in 2012) allowed non-archaeologists to work at the site as volunteer archaeologists in late spring and early summer. They worked in various field and lab roles on teams headed by professional archaeologists and graduate students.

References

External links
Topper Site page
CNN: "Man In Americas Earlier Than Thought", Quote: The University of South Carolina announces radiocarbon tests that dated the first human settlement in North America to 50,000 years ago.

Archaeological sites in South Carolina
Geography of Allendale County, South Carolina
Pre-Clovis archaeological sites in the Americas